(born Chiba Prefecture, 25 September 1979) is a Japanese rugby union player with 22 caps and 0 points in aggregate. He played as flanker, lock and number eight.

Career
Asano started to play rugby when he attended  Hongō High School. Later, he went to play for the Hosei University rugby union team until his graduation in 2002, when he joined NEC, where he would play for his entire club career until his retirement in 2014. At international level he debuted for a non-test Japan national team in 2002, although his first test cap would be on 5 June 2003, during a match against Australia A, at Hanazono, Osaka. He was also part of the 2003 and 2007 Japan World Cup squads.  His last international cap was on 20 September 2007, during a match against Wales, at the Millennium Stadium, Cardiff. As of September 2012, Asano played 100 games in Top League.  After his retirement, Asano became coach of the  rugby team in Tochigi.

Notes

.

External links
Ryota Asano international statistics at ESPN Scrum
Ryota Asano's Twitter profile
Ryota Asano's blog

1979 births
Sportspeople from Chiba Prefecture
Living people
Japanese rugby union players
Green Rockets Tokatsu players
Japan international rugby union players
Rugby union flankers
Rugby union locks
Rugby union number eights